Charles Marquette (1845–1907) was a Sergeant in the United States Army and a Medal of Honor recipient for his role in the American Civil War.

Marquette joined the army from Lebanon, Pennsylvania in October 1861 and was mustered out in June 1865

Medal of Honor citation
Rank and organization: Sergeant, Company F, 93d Pennsylvania Infantry. Place and date: At Petersburg, Va., April 2, 1865. Entered service at: Lebanon County, Pa. Birth: Lebanon County, Pa. Date of issue: May 10, 1865.

Citation:

Sergeant Marquette, although wounded, was one of the first to plant colors on the enemy's breastworks.

See also
 List of Medal of Honor recipients
 List of American Civil War Medal of Honor recipients: M–P

Notes

References

This article includes text in the public domain from the U.S. Government.
 

1845 births
1907 deaths
United States Army Medal of Honor recipients
United States Army soldiers
People from Lebanon County, Pennsylvania
People of Pennsylvania in the American Civil War
American Civil War recipients of the Medal of Honor